Tony Scheffler (born February 15, 1983) is a former American football tight end of the National Football League (NFL). He was drafted by the Denver Broncos in the second round of the 2006 NFL Draft. He played college football and baseball at Western Michigan.

Scheffler also played for the Detroit Lions during his NFL career.

Early years

Scheffler played at Chelsea High School in Chelsea, Michigan, where he played high school football. He set a school record for receiving yards in a season with 1,340 and finished the 2000 season with 67 receptions and 16 touchdowns playing wide receiver. He committed to play college football and baseball at Western Michigan University

College career

Scheffler attended Western Michigan University and had 117 receptions and 1,345 receiving yards with 13 touchdowns in his career. He finished his career ranked second among tight ends in both receptions and receiving yards in school history. He was also a two-time first team all-Mid-American Conference selection, and as a senior placed fourth in voting for the John Mackey Award as the nation's best tight end, posting a career-high 57 receptions for 670 yards (11.8 avg.) with nine touchdowns.

Professional career

Pre-draft

Denver Broncos

Scheffler was drafted by the Denver Broncos in the second round of the 2006 NFL Draft. After seeing limited playing time early in the season, Scheffler saw increased playing time and production after Jay Cutler was inserted as the Broncos starting quarterback on December 3, 2006, against the Seattle Seahawks. In a game against the San Diego Chargers on December 10, Scheffler caught his first NFL touchdown from a pass by Cutler. After the following kickoff was fumbled, Scheffler caught another touchdown, 48 seconds after his previous one.

On May 19, 2007, Scheffler broke his left foot in seven-on-seven passing drills during practice. The injury caused Scheffler to miss much of training camp, the setback kept Scheffler out of his place in the lineup as the Broncos pass receiving tight end until October 21, 2007, against the Pittsburgh Steelers. Scheffler finished the season among league leaders of tight ends with 49 receptions for 549 yards and five touchdowns.

Following the 2007 season, Scheffler, Cutler and Marshall went to Atlanta together to train and work on timing for the 2008 season.

On April 14, 2010, Scheffler was re-signed to a one-year contract.

Detroit Lions
On April 19, 2010, Scheffler was traded to the Detroit Lions in a three-team trade involving the Philadelphia Eagles. The Eagles received linebacker Ernie Sims, and the Broncos got the Eagles fifth-round draft pick for 2010 (137th overall).  The Lions also received Denver's seventh-round draft pick for 2010.

On October 22, 2013, Scheffler was released by the Lions after suffering his third concussion in four years earlier in the month.

On June 11, 2014, Scheffler announced his retirement, citing the concussions he sustained as a key reason. He signed three contracts during his career and subsequently earned $12,194,000 in his eight-year career in the NFL.

Barstool Backyard Basketball Game

On September 28, 2013, Scheffler competed in a 2 on 1 basketball game vs Dave Portnoy and Daniel "Big Cat" Katz of Barstool Sports. Despite Scheffler having a big lead the entire game, Portnoy's hot shooting earned the Barstool bloggers a comeback 11–10 victory. Famous NBA father Dell Curry would later say it was the greatest shooting expedition he's ever seen. After the loss, an irate Scheffler refused to shake hands and was last seen punting the basketball into a dense forest.

References

External links
 Official website

1983 births
American football tight ends
Denver Broncos players
Detroit Lions players
Living people
People from Lenawee County, Michigan
Players of American football from Michigan
Western Michigan Broncos baseball players
Western Michigan Broncos football players